The SZD-27 Kormoran  (Cormorant) (Szybowcowy Zakład Doświadczalny - Glider experimental department)  was a two-seat glider designed in Poland from 1961.

Development 
The SZD-27 Kormoran was designed to cater for the large demand from Polish aeroclubs for two-seat training machines, for basic training, advanced training and aerobatics. The SZD-27 was the first and only glider designed by SZD to be built entirely of metal, with light alloy skins, formers, ribs, frames etc., with steel high strength detail parts. The undercarriage comprises a semi-recessed mainwheel with skids under the nose and at the tail. Only two were built which both survive, one in the Kraków museum store-house and one restored to airworthiness in the 1990s by a private owner. The SZD-27 Kormoran resembles a cross between a LET L-13 Blaník and an SZD-24 Foka.

Specifications (SZD-27 Kormoran)

See also

References

Further reading

External links

 http://www.luftfahrtmuseum.com/htmi/itf/szd27.htm
 https://web.archive.org/web/20090916142935/http://www.szdjezow.com.pl/ofirmie_eng.html
 http://www.flightglobal.com/pdfarchive/view/1962/1962%20-%200016.html
 http://www.flightglobal.com/pdfarchive/view/1962/1962%20-%200017.html

SZD-27
1960s Polish sailplanes
Aircraft first flown in 1965